Rabbit Creek is a stream in the U.S. state of South Dakota. It is a tributary of the Moreau River.

Some say Rabbit Creek takes its name from nearby Rabbit Butte, while others believe the creek was named after the wild rabbits along its course.

See also
List of rivers of South Dakota

References

Rivers of Harding County, South Dakota
Rivers of Perkins County, South Dakota
Rivers of South Dakota